Adil Shamji  is a Canadian physician and politician who has represented Don Valley East in the Ontario Legislative Assembly since 2022, as a member of the Ontario Liberal Party. Before entering politics, Shamji was an emergency physician at Michael Garron Hospital. He was born in Canada to Gujarati immigrant parents from East Africa.

Education and medical career 
Shamji earned a Bachelor of Medical Science (BMSc) in microbiology and immunology from the University of Western Ontario in 2007, and a Doctor of Medicine (MD) from the University of Toronto in 2011, later specializing in family medicine and emergency medicine.

After medical school, Shamji worked in northern Canada for the Government of Northwest Territories, and later completed a Master of Public Policy (MPP) in 2017 from Oxford University's Blavatnik School of Government.

Shortly after returning to Toronto, the COVID-19 pandemic hit. Shamji worked as the medical director of the enhanced shelter support program, which provides medical care to homeless people, establishing primary care clinics in eight hotels leased out by the city as temporary shelters.

Political career 
Shamji was elected to the Legislative Assembly of Ontario in the 2022 provincial election.

He is the Liberal Party's critic for health, northern development, Indigenous affairs, and colleges and universities.

References 

Living people
Canadian politicians of Indian descent
Ontario Liberal Party MPPs
Politicians from Toronto
21st-century Canadian politicians
Year of birth missing (living people)